Edgar Napoléon Henry Ney (1812–1882) was the 3rd Prince of the Moskva, and fourth son of the 1st prince Michel Ney.

References

Princes de la Moskowa
1812 births
1882 deaths